Paul Kane (September 3, 1810 – February 20, 1871) was an Irish-born Canadian painter, famous for his paintings of First Nations peoples in the Canadian West and other Native Americans in the Columbia District.

A largely self-educated artist, Paul Kane grew up in York, Upper Canada (now Toronto) and trained himself by copying European masters on a "Grand Tour" study trip through Europe. He undertook two voyages through the Canadian northwest in 1845 and from 1846 to 1848. The first trip took him from Toronto to Sault Ste. Marie and back. Having secured the support of the Hudson's Bay Company, he set out on a second, much longer voyage from Toronto across the Rocky Mountains to Fort Vancouver (present-day Vancouver, Washington) and Fort Victoria (present day Victoria, British Columbia).

On both trips Kane sketched and painted First Nations and Métis peoples. Upon his return to Toronto, he produced more than one hundred oil paintings from these sketches. The oil paintings he completed in his studio are considered a part of the Canadian heritage, although he often embellished them considerably, departing from the accuracy of his field sketches in favour of more dramatic scenes. Kane's work followed the tenets of salvage ethnography.

Early life and formative years
Kane was born in Mallow, County Cork in Ireland, the fifth child of the eight children of Michael Kane and Frances Loach. His father, a soldier from Preston, Lancashire, England, served in the Royal Horse Artillery until his discharge in 1801. The family then settled in Ireland. Sometime between 1819 and 1822, when Kane was around ten, they immigrated to Upper Canada and settled in York (now Toronto). There, Kane's father operated a shop as a spirits and wine merchant.

Not much is known about Kane's youth in York, which at that time was a small settlement of a few thousand people. He went to school at Upper Canada College, and then received some training in painting by an art teacher named Thomas Drury at the Upper Canada College around 1830. In July 1834, he displayed some of his paintings in the first (and only) exhibition of The Society of Artists and Amateurs in Toronto, gaining a favourable review by a local newspaper, The Patriot.

Kane began a career as a sign and furniture painter at York until he moved to Cobourg, Ontario, in 1834. He may have taken up a job in the furniture factory of Freeman Schermerhorn Clench, the father of Harriet Clench who Kane married in 1853. While in Cobourg, Kane painted several portraits of the local personalities, including the sheriff and his employer's wife. In 1836 Kane moved to Detroit, Michigan, where the American artist James Bowman was living. The two had met earlier at York.  Bowman had persuaded Kane that studying art in Europe was a necessity for an aspiring painter, and they had planned to travel to Europe together, along with Samuel Bell Waugh. But Kane had to postpone the trip, as he was short of money to pay for the passage to Europe and Bowman had married shortly before and was not inclined to leave his family. For the next five years, Kane toured the American Midwest, working as an itinerant portrait painter, travelling to New Orleans.

In June 1841, Kane left America, sailing from New Orleans aboard a ship bound for Marseilles in France, arriving there about three months later, and immediately made out for Italy. Kane hiked much of this journey, travelling on foot from Rome to Naples, as well as the Brenner Pass in Switzerland. He went on to Paris, then London. In London he may have encountered George Catlin, an American salvage painter who had made his career painting Native Americans on the prairies and who now was on a promotion tour for his book, Letters and Notes on the Manners, Customs and Conditions of the North American Indians.  Catlin lectured at Egyptian Hall at Piccadilly, where he also exhibited some of his paintings. In his book Catlin argued that the cultures of Native Americans were disappearing and should be recorded before passing into oblivion. Kane found the argument compelling and decided to similarly document Canadian First Nations.

Kane returned in early 1843 to Mobile, Alabama, where he set up a studio and worked as a portrait painter until he had paid back the money borrowed for his voyage to Europe. He returned to Toronto late 1844 or early 1845 and immediately began preparing for his journey west.

Travels in the Northwest

Kane set out on his own on June 17, 1845, travelling along the northern shores of the Lake Huron, moving through Saugeen land. After weeks of sketching, he reached Sault Ste. Marie between Lake Superior and Lake Huron in summer 1845. He had intended to travel further west, but John Ballenden, the local Chief Trader for the Hudson's Bay Company stationed at Sault Ste. Marie, told him of the many difficulties and perils of travelling alone through the western territories and advised Kane to attempt such a feat only with the support of the company. After the Hudson's Bay Company had taken over its competitor, the North West Company of Montreal, in 1821, the whole territory west of the Great Lakes until the Pacific Ocean and the Oregon Country was operating under their monopoly, with about a hundred isolated outposts of the company along the major fur trade routes. Kane returned to Toronto for the winter, elaborating his field sketches to oil canvases, and in spring of the next year, he went to the headquarters of the Hudson's Bay Company at Lachine and asked company governor George Simpson for support for his travel plans. Simpson was impressed by Kane's artistic ability, and the letters of support of Ballenden and John Henry Lefroy, but at the same time worried that Kane might not have the stamina needed to travel with the fur brigades of the company. He granted Kane passage on company canoes only as far as Lake Winnipeg, with the promise of full passage if the artist did well until then. Kane would travel HBC routes with the company's explicit aid and blessing for the next two years, and much of his sketching was done at their tradeposts.

Going west

On May 9, 1846, Kane departed by steamboat from Toronto with the intent to join a canoe brigade from Lachine at Sault Ste. Marie. After an overnight stop, he missed the boat, which had left in the morning earlier than advertised, and he had to race after it by canoe. Arriving at the Sault, he learned that the canoe brigade had already left, so he sailed aboard a freight schooner to Fort William on Thunder Bay. He finally caught up with the canoes about  beyond Fort William on the Kaministiquia River on May 24.

By June 4 Kane reached Fort Frances, where a pass from Simpson for travelling further was awaiting him. His next stop was the Red River Colony (near modern-day Winnipeg). There, he embarked on a three-week excursion by horse, joining a large Métis hunting band that went buffalo hunting in Sioux lands in Dakota Territory in the United States. On June 26 Kane witnessed and participated in one of the last great buffalo hunts, which within a few decades, aided by railroad travel, decimated the animals to near-extinction. Upon his return he continued by canoe and sailing boats by way of Norway House, Grand Rapids, and The Pas up the Saskatchewan River to Fort Carlton. For variety, he continued from there on horseback to Fort Edmonton, witnessing a Cree buffalo pound hunt along the way.

On October 6, 1846, Kane left Edmonton for Fort Assiniboine, where he again embarked with a canoe brigade up the Athabasca River to Jasper's House, arriving on November 3. Here he joined a large horse troop bound west, but the party soon had to send the horses back to Jasper's House and continue on snowshoes, taking only the essentials with them, because Athabasca Pass was already too deeply snowed in that late in the year. They crossed the pass on November 12 and three days later joined a canoe brigade that had been waiting to take them down the Columbia River.

In the Oregon country

Finally, Kane arrived on December 18, 1846, at Fort Vancouver, the main trading post and headquarters of the Hudson's Bay Company in the Oregon Territory. He stayed there over winter, sketching among and studying the Chinookan and other tribes in the vicinity and making several excursions, including a longer one of three weeks through the Willamette Valley. He enjoyed the social life at Fort Vancouver, which at that time was being visited by the British ship Modeste, and became friends with Peter Skene Ogden.

On March 25, 1847, Kane set out by canoe to Fort Victoria, which had been founded shortly before to become the new company headquarters, as the operations at Fort Vancouver were to be wound down and relocated following the conclusion of the Oregon Treaty of 1846, which fixed the continental border between Canada and the United States west of the Rocky Mountains at the 49th parallel north. Kane went up the Cowlitz River and stayed for a week among the tribes living there in the vicinity of Mount St. Helens before continuing on horseback to Nisqually (today Tacoma) and then by canoe again to Fort Victoria.

His painting of Mount St. Helens in eruption at night in 1847 which is in the collection of the Royal Ontario Museum in Toronto was the only known image of an active Cascade volcano until the eruption of Lassen Peak in California in 1914. Although the scene was somewhat fictionalized, it did correctly show the active vent on the side of the volcano rather that the summit. He stayed for two months in that area, traveling and sketching among the Native Americans on Vancouver Island and around the Juan de Fuca Strait and the Strait of Georgia. He returned to Fort Vancouver in mid-June, from where he departed to return east on July 1, 1847.

Crossing the Rockies again
By mid-July Kane had reached Fort Walla Walla where he made a minor detour to visit the Whitman Mission that a few months later would be the site of the Whitman massacre. He went with Marcus Whitman to visit the Cayuse living in the area and happened to draw a portrait of Tomahas (Kane gives the name as "To-ma-kus"), the man who would later be named as Whitman's murderer. According to Kane's travel report, the relations between the Cayuse and the settlers at the mission were already strained by the time of his visit in July.

Kane continued with one guide by horseback through the Grande Coulée to Fort Colvile, where he stayed for six weeks, sketching and painting the natives who had set up a fishing camp below Kettle Falls at this time of the salmon run. On September 22, 1847, Kane assumed command of a canoe brigade up the Columbia River and arrived on October 10 at Boat Encampment. The party had to wait for three weeks until a badly delayed horse trek from Jasper arrived. Then they switched, the horse team taking over the canoes and going down the Columbia River, and Kane's group loading their cargo on the horses and taking them back over Athabasca Pass. They managed to bring all 56 horses safely and without loss to Jasper's House, despite the heavy snow and intense cold. As the canoes that should have been awaiting them had already left, they were forced to set out on snowshoes and with a dog sled to Fort Assiniboine, where they arrived after much hardship and without food two weeks later. After a few days' rest, they continued to Fort Edmonton, where they spent the winter.

Kane passed the time at the fort with buffalo hunting, and also sketched among the Cree living in the vicinity. In January he undertook an excursion to Fort Pitt, some  down the Saskatchewan River, and then returned to Edmonton. In April he visited Rocky Mountain House, where he wanted to meet the Blackfoot. When they did not turn up, he returned to Edmonton.

Going back east

On May 25, 1848, Kane left Fort Edmonton, travelling with a large party of 23 boats and 130 people bound for York Factory, led by John Edward Harriott.  On June 1 they met with a large war party of some 1,500 warriors of Blackfoot and other tribes who were planning a raid against the Cree and Assiniboine. On that occasion Kane met the Blackfoot chief Big Snake (Omoxesisixany). The canoe brigade stayed as briefly as possible and then continued hastily down the river. On June 18 they arrived at Norway House, where Kane stayed for a month, waiting for the annual meeting of the chief factors of the Hudson's Bay Company and the arrival of the party with which he was bound to travel further. On July 24 he departed with the party of one Major McKenzie; they travelled along the eastern shore of Lake Winnipeg to Fort Alexander. From there on Kane followed the same route he had taken two years earlier going west: by the Lake of the Woods, Fort Frances, and Rainy Lake, he travelled by canoe to Fort William and then along the northern shore of Lake Superior until he reached Sault Ste. Marie on October 1, 1848. From there he returned by steamboat to Toronto, where he landed on October 13. He noted in his book on this last leg of his journey: "the greatest hardship that I had to endure [now] was the difficulty in trying to sleep in a civilized bed".

Life in Toronto

Kane permanently settled in Toronto.  He went West once more when he was hired by a British party in 1849 as a guide and interpreter, but they went only as far as the Red River Colony. An exhibition of 240 of his sketches in November 1848 in Toronto met with great success, and a second exhibition in September 1852 of eight oil canvases was also received favourably. The politician George William Allan took note of the artist and became his most important patron, commissioning one hundred oil paintings for the price of $20,000 in 1852.  This enabled Kane to live a life as a professional artist. Kane also succeeded in 1851 to convince the Parliament of the Province of Canada to commission twelve paintings for the sum of £500, which he delivered in late 1856.

In 1853, Kane married Harriet Clench (1823–1892), the daughter of his former employer at Cobourg. David Wilson, a contemporary historian of the University of Toronto, reported that she was also a skilled painter and writer. They had four children, two sons and two daughters.

Until 1857, Kane fulfilled his commissions: more than 120 oil canvases for Allan, the Parliament, and Simpson. His works were shown at the World's Fair at Paris in 1855, where they were reviewed very positively, and some of them were sent to Buckingham Palace in 1858 for consideration by Queen Victoria.  By that time Kane had also prepared a manuscript derived from his travel notes and sent to a publishing house in London for publication. When he did not hear back from them, he travelled to London and, with the support of Simpson, got the book published the next year. It was titled The Wanderings of an Artist among the Indians of North America from Canada to Vancouver's Island and Oregon through the Hudson's Bay Company's Territory and Back Again and was originally published by Longman, Brown, Green, Longmans & Roberts in London in 1859, illustrated with many lithographs of his own sketches and paintings. Kane had dedicated the book to Allan, which upset Simpson so that he broke off his relations with Kane. The book was an immediate success and had appeared by 1863 in French, Danish, and German editions.

Kane's eyesight was failing rapidly in the 1860s and forced him to abandon painting altogether. Frederick Arthur Verner, who had been inspired by Kane and was an artist of "western" scenes, became an acquaintance and friend. Verner did three portraits of the ageing Paul Kane, one of which is today at the Royal Ontario Museum. Kane died unexpectedly one winter morning in his home, just having returned from his daily walk. He is buried at the St. James Cemetery in Toronto.

Works

The bulk of Kane's oeuvre is the more than 700 sketches he made during his two voyages to the west and the more than one hundred oil canvases he later elaborated from them in his studio in Toronto. Of his early portraits done at York or Cobourg before his travels, Harper writes, "[they] are primitive in approach but have a direct appeal and a warm colouring that make them attractive". The rest are an unknown number of paintings from his time as an itinerant portraitist in the United States, plus a number of copies of classic paintings he did while in Europe.

Kane's fame rests in his depictions of Native American life. His field sketches were done in pencil, watercolour, or oil on paper. He also brought back from his trips a collection of various artefacts such as masks, pipe stems, and other handicrafts.  Together, these formed the basis for his later studio work. He drew on this pool of impressions for his large oil canvases, in which he typically combined or reinterpreted them to create new compositions. The field sketches are a valuable resource for ethnologists, but the oil paintings, while still truthful in the individual details of Native American lifestyle, are often unfaithful to geographic, historic, or ethnographic settings in their overall compositions.

One well-known example of this process is Kane's painting Flathead woman and child, in which he combined a sketch of a Chinookan baby having its head flattened by being strapped to a cradle board with a later field portrait of a Cowlitz woman living in a different region. Another example of how Kane elaborated his sketches can be seen in his painting Indian encampment on Lake Huron, which is based on a sketch taken in summer 1845 during his first trip to Sault Ste. Marie. The painting has a distinct romantic flair accentuated by the lighting and the dramatic clouds, while the scene of the camp life depicted is reminiscent of a European idealized rural peasant scene.

Indeed, Kane often created completely fictitious scenes from several sketches for his oil paintings. His oil canvas of Mount St. Helens erupting shows a major and dramatic volcanic eruption, but from his travel diary and the field sketches he made, it is evident that the mountain had only been smoking gently at the time of Kane's visit. (It had, however, erupted three years earlier.) In other paintings he combined river sketches taken at different times and places into one painting, creating an artificial landscape that does not exist in reality. His painting of The Death of Big Snake shows an entirely imaginary scene: the Blackfoot chief Omoxesisixany died only in 1858, more than two years after the painting was completed.

His models were the classic European paintings, but Kane also had plain economic reasons for composing his oil paintings in the more mannered style of the European art tradition. He wanted and had to sell his paintings to make a living, and he knew his clientele well enough: his patrons were unlikely to decorate their homes with unadorned copies in oil of his field sketches; they demanded something more presentable and closer to the generally Eurocentric expectations of the time.

Kane's embellishment is evident in his painting Assiniboine hunting buffalo, one of the twelve done for the parliament. The painting has been criticized for its horses, which look more like Arabian horses than anything relevant to the Canadian West. The composition has even been found to be based on an 1816 engraving from Italy showing two Romans hunting a bull. Already in 1877, Nicholas Flood Davin commented on this discrepancy, stating that "the Indian horses are Greek horses, the hills have much of the colour and form of those of [...] the early European landscape painters, ..." And Lawrence Johnstone Burpee added in his introduction to the 1925 reprint of Kane's travel book that the sketches were "truer interpretations of the wild western life" and had "in some respects a higher value as art".  Twentieth century and later art theory is less judging than Burpee but agrees insofar as Kane's field sketches are generally considered more accurate and authentic. "Kane was the recorder in the field and the artist in the studio", write Davis and Thacker.

Kane is generally considered a classic and one of the most important Canadian painters. The eleven surviving paintings done for the parliament—one painting was lost in the fire on Parliament Hill in 1916—were transferred in 1955 to the National Gallery of Canada. The large Allan collection was bought by Edmund Boyd Osler in 1903 and donated to the Royal Ontario Museum in Toronto in 1912. A collection of 229 sketches was sold by Kane's grandson Paul Kane III for about US$100,000 to the Stark Museum of Art in Orange, Texas, in 1957.

A rare painting of his, Scene in the Northwest: Portrait of John Henry Lefroy, showing British surveyor John Henry Lefroy, which had been in possession of the Lefroy family in England, garnered a record price at an auction at Sotheby's in Toronto on February 25, 2002, when Canadian billionaire Kenneth Thomson won the bid at C$5,062,500 including the buyer's premium (US$3,172,567.50 at the time). Thomson subsequently donated the painting as part of his Thomson Collection to the Art Gallery of Ontario. The Glenbow Museum in Calgary has a copy of this painting that is thought to have been done by Kane's wife Harriet Clench. Another auction at Sotheby's on November 22, 2004, for Kane's oil painting Encampment, Winnipeg River (after the field sketch shown above) failed when bidding stopped at C$1.7 million, less than the expected sale price of C$2–2.5 million.

Kane's travel report, published originally in London in 1859, was a great success already in its time and has been reprinted several times in the twentieth century. In 1986 Dawkins criticized Kane's work based mainly on this travel account, but also on the "European" nature of his oil paintings, as showing the imperialistic or even racist tendencies of the artist. This view remains rather singular among art historians. Kane's travel diary, which formed the basis for the 1859 book, does not contain any pejorative judgements. MacLaren reported that Kane's travel notes were written in a style very different from the published text, such that it must be considered highly likely that the book was heavily edited by others or even ghostwritten to turn Kane's notes into a Victorian travel account, and that it was thus difficult at best to ascribe any perceived racism to the artist himself.

Legacy and influence

As one of the first Canadian painters who could earn a living from his artwork alone, Kane prepared the ground for many later artists. His travels inspired others to similar journeys, and a very direct artistic influence is evident in the case of F. A. Verner, whose mentor Kane became in his later years. According to Harper, the early Lucius O'Brien was also influenced by Kane's work. Kane's 1848 exhibition of his sketches, which included 155 watercolour and 85 oil on paper paintings, helped establish the genre in the minds of the public and cleared the way for artists like William Cresswell or Daniel Fowler, who both were able to make a living from their watercolour paintings.

Both his 1848 exhibition of the sketches and the later 1852 show of some of his oil paintings were great success and lauded by several newspapers. Kane was the most prominent painter in Upper Canada in his time. He frequently entered his paintings at art exhibitions and won numerous prizes for his works. He dominated the scene throughout the 1850s, even to the point where an art jury all but presented their excuses when they did not award him the prize in the category for historical paintings at the annual exhibition of the Upper Canada Agricultural Society in 1852. (Kane won that prize consecutively in all years until 1859, though.)

Kane was one of the first, if not the first, tourist to travel across the Canadian west and the Pacific north-west. Through his sketches and paintings, and later also his book, the public at large in Upper and Lower Canada for the first time caught a glimpse of the peoples and their lifestyles in this vast and barely known territory. Kane had set out with a sincere desire to accurately portray his experiences—the landscape, the people, their tools. Yet it was primarily his embellished studio work that gained public appeal and made him famous. His idealized oil paintings and the similarly transformed travel notes that became his book were both a factor in the establishment and spreading of the perception of the North American indigenous people as noble savages, contrary to what the artist had intended. The more truthful field sketches were "rediscovered" and valued by a wider audience only in the twentieth century.

In 1937 Kane was declared a National Historic Person, and a plaque to commemorate him was dedicated in Rocky Mountain House in 1952.

On August 11, 1971, the year of the centenary of Kane's death, Canada Post issued a postage stamp entitled 'Paul Kane, painter', designed by William Rueter based on Kane's painting "Indian Encampment on Lake Huron". The 7¢ stamps have 12.5 perforation and were printed by the British American Bank Note Company.

In 1978, the City of Toronto purchased the dilapidated Paul Kane House, which Kane and his heirs had lived in. The building  was later designated a heritage structure under the Ontario Heritage Act. In 1985, the structure was refurbished and the front yard developed into a small park.

Paul Kane High School in St. Albert, Alberta was named in honor of Kane. A park in the Oliver neighbourhood of Edmonton was also named after him.

Further reading

See also
 Elbridge Ayer Burbank
 George Catlin
 Seth and Mary Eastman
 W. Langdon Kihn
 Charles Bird King
 Joseph Henry Sharp
 John Mix Stanley

Footnotes

References
The main sources used for this article are Eaton/Urbanek, the Garvin reprint of Kane's travel journal, and Harper's entry for Kane in the Dictionary of Canadian Biography.

Bibliography 
 Bosley, A.: "A Brush with Reality", Ottawa Citizen; April 21, 2002.
 Fitzgerald, W. R.: On the Threshold of a Dream; exhibition catalogue; Bruce County Museum & Cultural Centre, 2005.
 
 
 MacLaren, I. S. :"I came to rite thare portraits": Paul Kane's Journal of His Western Travels, 1846–1848, American Art Journal 21(2), 1989.

External links

 
 
Paul Kane at the Canadian Encyclopedia.

Paul Kane Interactive, by CineFocus Canada
Sketches of Paul Kane at the Stark Museum of Art
Visions from the Wilderness: The Art of Paul Kane, online documentary produced by CineFocus Canada
Paul Kane Goes West, online documentary produced by the National Film Board of Canada
Another photograph of Paul Kane, undated. Library and Archives of Canada, reproduction number C-000261.
A photograph of Kane's wife, Harriet Clench.

1810 births
1871 deaths
Irish emigrants to pre-Confederation Ontario
19th-century Canadian painters
Canadian male painters
19th-century Irish painters
Irish male painters
Persons of National Historic Significance (Canada)
People from County Cork
Artists from Toronto
Pre-Confederation Ontario people
Oregon Country
19th-century Canadian male artists
19th-century Irish male artists